Weston railway station was a station in Weston, Lincolnshire on the Midland and Great Northern Joint Railway, Built by the Norwich and Spalding Railway and opened on 15 November 1858. It was on the main line between the Midlands and the Norfolk Coast, a route commonly used by holidaymakers in the summer months. It closed to passengers on 2 March 1959. The line divided west of here, some trains running in to terminate at Spalding and others carrying on west into the Midlands.

References

Disused railway stations in Lincolnshire
Former Midland and Great Northern Joint Railway stations
Railway stations in Great Britain opened in 1858
Railway stations in Great Britain closed in 1959